Gomphostemma is a genus of flowering plants in the mint family, Lamiaceae, first described in 1830. It is native to Southeast Asia, China, and the Indian subcontinent.

Species
Gomphostemma aborensis Dunn - Arunachal Pradesh
Gomphostemma arbusculum C.Y.Wu - Yunnan
Gomphostemma callicarpoides (Yamam.) Masam. - Taiwan
Gomphostemma chinense Oliv. - Fujian, Guangdong, Guangxi, Hainan, Jiangxi, Vietnam
Gomphostemma crinitum Wall. ex Benth. - Indochina, Yunnan, Assam, Bangladesh
Gomphostemma curtisii Prain - Malaya, Sumatra, Borneo
Gomphostemma deltodon C.Y.Wu - Yunnan
Gomphostemma dolichobotrys Merr. - Sumatra
Gomphostemma eriocarpum Benth. - southern India
Gomphostemma grandiflorum Doan ex Suddee & A.J.Paton - Vietnam
Gomphostemma hainanense C.Y.Wu - Hainan
Gomphostemma hemsleyanum Prain ex Collett & Hemsl. - Java, Myanmar
Gomphostemma heyneanum Wall. ex Benth. - southern India
Gomphostemma hirsutum Walsingham - Sabah
Gomphostemma inopinatum Prain - Myanmar
Gomphostemma javanicum (Blume) Benth. - Indochina, Andaman Islands, Borneo, Sumatra, Java, Sulawesi, Bali, Lombok, Timor, Philippines 
Gomphostemma keralensis Vivek., Gopalan & R.Ansari. - Kerala
Gomphostemma lacei Mukerjee - Myanmar
Gomphostemma latifolium C.Y.Wu - Yunnan, Guangdong
Gomphostemma leptodon Dunn - Guangxi, Vietnam
Gomphostemma lucidum Wall. ex Benth. - Indochina, Assam, Bangladesh, Guangdong, Guangxi, Yunnan
Gomphostemma mastersii Benth. ex Hook.f. - Assam, Bangladesh, Thailand
Gomphostemma melissifolium Wall. ex Benth. - Assam, Bangladesh, Bhutan, Nepal
Gomphostemma microcalyx Prain - Borneo, Malaya, Sumatra
Gomphostemma microdon Dunn - Yunnan, Laos, Thailand, Vietnam
Gomphostemma nayarii A.S.Chauhan - Assam
Gomphostemma niveum Hook.f. - Assam, Arunachal Pradesh, Vietnam
Gomphostemma nutans Hook.f. - Assam, Myanmar
Gomphostemma ovatum Wall. ex Benth. - Assam, Bangladesh, Bhutan, Nepal
Gomphostemma parviflorum Wall. ex Benth. - Assam, Bangladesh, Bhutan, Nepal, Yunnan, Indochina, Borneo, Java, Sumatra
Gomphostemma pedunculatum Benth. ex Hook.f. - Assam, Yunnan, Vietnam
Gomphostemma pseudocrinitum C.Y.Wu - Guangxi
Gomphostemma salarkhanianum Khanam & M.A.Hassan - Sylhet District in Bangladesh
Gomphostemma scortechinii Prain - Myanmar, Thailand, Malaya
Gomphostemma stellatohirsutum C.Y.Wu - Yunnan
Gomphostemma strobilinum Wall. ex Benth. - Bangladesh, Myanmar, Thailand, Vietnam
Gomphostemma sulcatum C.Y.Wu - Yunnan
Gomphostemma thomsonii Benth. ex Hook.f. - Assam
Gomphostemma velutinum Benth. - Assam, Bangladesh
Gomphostemma wallichii Prain - Assam, Myanmar, Thailand

References

Lamiaceae
Lamiaceae genera